Annalise Keating Esq. (née Anna-Mae Harkness) is a fictional character in the legal drama series How to Get Away with Murder. Series creator Peter Nowalk is responsible for creating and developing the character, and American actress Viola Davis portrayed Keating since the show's inception. Annalise is introduced as a complex, high-profile criminal defense attorney and law professor at Middleton University who maintains social prestige and navigates through university politics. The series' main narrative starts when Annalise chooses five of her students to work with her and they get in the middle of a murder case. Throughout the series' course, Annalise is very protective of her students, who become her allies, and is balancing between her personal life and the public scrutiny.

Characterization 
On February 25, 2014, it was announced that Viola Davis was cast in the show's leading role of Professor Annalise Keating. Annalise is introduced as a self-sufficient and confident woman who seems to have a perfect life and is respected for her professionalism, who people both fear and admire. Throughout the series, she experiences emotional changes and her alcohol addiction increases as she gets involved in multiple crimes with her associates.

Storylines

Background 
Annalise was born Anna Mae Harkness, the daughter of Ophelia and Mac, and the sister of Celestine and Thelonious. Her father was absent during much of her life. As a child, she was sexually abused by her uncle Clyde, who was living with them. Ophelia saw Clyde leaving her room and realized what had happened, which led her to take her children away and burn down the house with Clyde inside. At law school, Annalise started a relationship with Eve Rothlo, but they broke up after Annalise fell in love with Sam Keating, who was married and left his wife to marry Annalise.

Season 1 
This season is set chronologically before and after the murder of Sam Keating. In flashbacks, Annalise is introduced as a criminal defense teacher at Middleton University who chooses students Laurel Castillo, Michaela Pratt, Connor Walsh, Asher Millstone, and Wes Gibbins to work exclusively in her law firm, where she is assisted by associates Frank Delfino and Bonnie Winterbottom. The body of Lila Stangard, a student who had been missing for months, is found and eventually it is revealed that Annalise's husband Sam was having an affair with Lila before she died. Lila's best friend Rebecca Sutter gets romantically involved with Gibbins while the local police department is investigating both Sutter and Lila's ex-boyfriend Griffin O'Reilly. When Sam starts suspecting that Rebecca is aware of his affair with Lila, he becomes violent towards her and attacks her one night when she tries to transfer his laptop data to a flash drive. Gibbins, Walsh, Pratt and Castillo appear to help Rebecca and during the showdown Michaela pushes Sam over the banister and onto the floor below. Sam is presumed dead, and the five ponder their next move, only to have Sam leap up and attack Rebecca. Wes clobbers Sam on the head with a trophy, killing him. The five burn his body in the woods under Annalise's complicity, who is aware of the murder and helps them to build up an alibi.

In flash-forwards, Annalise deals with the police investigating Sam's whereabouts, which Annalise makes it looks connected to Lila's death by making their affair public. Sam's sister Hannah Keating arrives in town searching for the truth and accusing Annalise of lying. The remains of Sam are found and Annalise incriminates her lover Nate Lahey as a way to avoid her student's arrest. However, she tries to help him go free by offering him a number of a fellow lawyer. She calls her mother to counsel her throughout this moment, though they have multiple arguments. One night, Wes calls her frightened and asks her to go to his apartment. There, she finds him and the others and learns that they strapped Rebecca with tape and locked her in the bathroom. Subsequently, the group takes Rebecca to the Keatings' household's basement, where they keep her while trying to build a case against her, framing her of killing Lila, a theory that they start believing when multiples proofs show up. When they decide to let her go after not finding anything concrete, Rebecca is gone. Annalise blames Wes for her whereabouts, whilst in fact she and Frank hid the body of Rebecca, who was killed by someone unknown to them.

Season 2

The first nine episodes focus on Annalise's case of Caleb and Catherine Hapstall and their alleged involvement in the death of their adoptive parents. The flash-forwards show Annalise getting shot in the stomach at Hapstall's mansion. The second part of the season focuses on Wes' investigation around his mother's suicide ten years prior, and it gets revealed from flashbacks how Annalise was involved with Wes' mother's suicide, as Wes' mother gets pressured to testify in Annalise's case against the Mahoney family. The season ends with Annalise finding that Frank was responsible for her being in a car accident and losing her baby.

Season 3

This season contains flash-forwards of Annalise’s house burning down, with an unknown male having died inside the house at the time of the fire. Annalise appears devastated by the death of the unknown male, sobbing and threatening the police to dare arrest her for burning down her own house, which they subsequently do.

In the main timeline, Annalise's position at the university is threatened after an unknown person targets her with a series of flyers identifying her as a killer. She admits to the university that she is struggling with alcoholism. Frank has also gone missing with Annalise and Nate trying to find him, while the murder of Wallace Mahoney is still under investigation. In the mid-season finale, Annalise is arrested after Wes' corpse is retrieved from her burning house. However, Nate discovers that Wes was already dead before the fire started.

The second part of the season focuses on the investigation about Wes' death, and the identity of his murderer. Annalise, after being arrested, is in jail, denied bail, depressed and unwilling to use the communal toilet in her cell.

Season 6
In flash-forwards, Annalise is shown to be dead under unknown circumstances with a funeral being held in her honor. In the present, Annalise has to deal with an FBI investigation and ultimately charges of being responsible for the deaths of Sam Keating, Ronald Miller, Asher Millstone, Rebecca Sutter, ADA Emily Sinclair, and Caleb Hapstall. With the FBI pressuring the Keating 3 and faced with her own demons, Annalise is left reevaluating her choices in life; ultimately, Annalise is exonerated after an impassioned closing argument in which Annalise confesses the crimes she has committed and opens herself up to the world for the first time. Minutes later, Annalise loses both Frank and Bonnie after they are killed in a shootout instigated by Frank when he killed the corrupt governor, who set up Annalise and murdered Nate's father.

It is subsequently revealed that the flash-forwards to Annalise's funeral take place many years into the future after Annalise has lived a long life alongside Tegan Price. Amongst those in attendance are Eve, Laurel, Connor, Oliver, and Christopher Castillo, Wes and Laurel's son. After Annalise's funeral, Christopher, who was mentored by Annalise throughout his life, becomes the professor of her old law class which he names How to Get Away With Murder in Annalise's honor. As Christopher starts his first class, he sees Annalise smiling at him for a moment amongst the students before she vanishes.

Reception 
For her performance as Keating, Viola Davis won the Primetime Emmy Award for Outstanding Lead Actress in a Drama Series in 2015. The role also won her two SAG Awards for Outstanding Performance by a Female Actor in a Drama Series, and one NAACP Image Award for Outstanding Actress in a Drama Series, as well as two Golden Globe nominations for Best Actress.

References

External links 
 Annalise Keating on IMDb

Female characters in television
Drama television characters
Fictional female lawyers
Fictional defense attorneys
Fictional feminists and women's rights activists
Fictional bisexual females
Fictional LGBT characters in television
Fictional African-American people
Fictional professors
Television characters introduced in 2014
How to Get Away with Murder
Fictional American lawyers
Fictional Harvard University people
 American female characters in television